Venice is the debut studio album by American rapper Anderson .Paak. It was released on October 28, 2014, by Steel Wool, OBE and Empire Distribution. Anderson .Paak produced the album, alongside several other record producers such as Lo_Def, DJ Nobody, DK the Punisher, Mikos the Gawd, Kelsey Gonzalez, Tokimonsta, Ta-Ku; as well as a guest appearance from SiR. The album was supported by two singles: "Drugs" and "Miss Right". The album also features lead guitar work by Jose Rios, acoustic & bass guitar from Kelsey Gonzalez and keyboard from Ron Avant, all members of his backing band, The Free Nationals.

Singles
The album's first single, called "Drugs", was released on January 17, 2014. The song was produced by Lo_Def.

The album's second single, called "Miss Right", was released on October 14, 2014. The song was produced by Anderson .Paak himself.

Reception

Track listing

References

External links 

2014 debut albums
Anderson .Paak albums
Albums produced by Anderson .Paak
Empire Distribution albums